Mahaguru is a 1985 Indian Hindi-language action film directed by S. S. Ravichandra starring Rajinikanth, Meenakshi Sheshadri in lead roles. It was notable as the only film in which Meenakshi Sheshadri was paired opposite Rajinikanth and for its witty dialogues written by Kader Khan. The film was dubbed into Tamil as Raja Guru.

Plot
Naagraj Darbari (Kader Khan) and his associate Shyam Kumar Talwari (Shafi Inamdar) rule over a small community in India with an iron hand. When former military officer, Subhash (Rakesh Roshan), comes home to his mother and sister, he is appalled at the conditions that the community is living in, and decides to do everything possible to improve their lot. This gets him in the bad books of Darbari and Talwari, who recruit a hit-man named Mahaguru (Rajinikanth) to deal with Subhash. Mahaguru confronts Subhash and severely beats him up, resulting in Subhash being crippled for life. Shortly thereafter, Mahaguru rescues Subhash's mother (Nirupa Roy) from some men who were molesting her. Village belle Basanti (Meenakshi Sheshadri), a close friend of Subhash, decides to have a go at turning Mahaguru around. She starts a friendship with him, finds out his name is really Vijay and he does respond positively and becomes attracted to her. This leaves Subhash free to assist the community, thus angering Darbari and Talwari all the more. They abduct Subhash and hold him prisoner, and then instruct Mahaguru to do away with him. Will Basanti's influence change Mahaguru? Or will he just act for anyone who gives him money?

Cast
 Rajnikanth as Vijay "Mahaguru"
 Meenakshi Sheshadri as Basanti 
 Rakesh Roshan as Subhash
 Nirupa Roy as Subhash's Mother
 Gulshan Grover as Girikar (Naagraj's Nephew)
 Kader Khan as Naagraj Darbari
 Shafi Inamdar as Shyam Kumar Talwari
 Shubha Khote as Chanda Talwari
 Jeetendra as himself (in the song "Pyar Ka Khel" from a movie)
 Sridevi as herself (in the song "Pyar Ka Khel" from a movie)

Music
It had four hit Songs composed by Bappi Lahiri. All are written by Indeevar and sung by Asha Bhosle.

References

External links
 Mahaguru at the Internet Movie Database

1985 films
1980s Hindi-language films
Films scored by Bappi Lahiri
Films directed by S. S. Ravichandra